Māori wards and constituencies refer to wards and constituencies on urban, district, and regional councils in New Zealand that represent local constituents registered on the Māori parliamentary electoral roll vote. Like Māori electorates within the New Zealand Parliament, the purpose of Māori wards and constituencies is to ensure that Māori are represented in local government decision making.

Māori wards and constituencies were first introduced by the Bay of Plenty Regional Council in 2001. Efforts to introduce them to other local and regional government bodies in New Zealand were complicated by a poll provision allowing referendums on the issue of introducing Māori wards and constituencies.  Consequently, attempts to introduce Māori wards and constituencies were defeated at several polls in New Plymouth, Palmerston North, the Western Bay of Plenty, Whakatāne, Manawatu, and Kaikōura.

In late February 2021, the Sixth Labour Government passed the Local Electoral (Māori Wards and Māori Constituencies) Amendment Act 2021, which eliminated the poll provision for establishing Māori wards and constituencies.

Background 
Although in 2006 Māori formed 14.6% of New Zealand's population, a Department of Internal Affairs (DIA) survey found that 12% of candidates not elected at the October 2007 local elections were Māori and only 8% of winning candidates were Māori. By contrast the 66% of the population who are European had an 84% chance of losing candidates and a 90%  chance of winning. The inequality was marginally smaller in 2016, with 89.8% of elected members being European and 10.1% Māori.

A feature of New Zealand's parliamentary representation arrangements is the system of Māori electorates, which are for electors of Māori descent who choose to be registered on the Māori electoral roll and are intended to give Māori a more direct say in Parliament. Equivalent provisions for local government are set out in section 19Z (and following) of the Local Electoral Act 2001. These provisions are opt-in and allow territorial authorities and regional councils to introduce Māori wards (in cities and districts) or constituencies (in regions) for electoral purposes.

The number of members elected to a council through its Māori wards or constituencies is determined after determining the total number of councillors for the city or district or region, in proportion to the number of members elected to the council through its general wards and constituencies, such that:The number of members excludes the mayor, who is elected separately. The total electoral population includes all electors in the city, district or region, regardless of whether they are on the general electoral roll or the Māori electoral roll. The number of Māori members is rounded to the nearest whole number. If the calculated number of Māori members is zero, the council must resolve against having separate Māori and general wards.

Until the passage of the Local Electoral (Māori Wards and Māori Constituencies) Amendment Act 2021 into law, Māori wards and constituencies could be established by decision of the council, or through a local referendum (called, under the Act, a "poll"). If a council resolved to establish Māori wards or constituencies, it had to notify its residents of their right to demand a poll on the establishment of the wards and constituencies (the "poll provision"). If a petition signed by 5 percent of the electors of the city, district or region was presented to the council, the poll must be held within 89 days. All electors (not specifically electors of Māori descent or those on the Māori electoral roll) could demand and vote in a binding poll on Māori wards and constituencies. The result of the poll was binding for two local body elections, after which the council could choose to retain the status quo or adopt another change.

History

Introduction
Māori wards and constituencies have proved contentious, as the poll provision (outlined above) has frequently overturned councils' decisions. While a general establishment provision has been available since 2002, the first Māori constituencies were established for the Bay of Plenty Regional Council in 2001 under a unique piece of legislation. Population ratios were such that the council was able to establish three Māori constituencies. The introduction of Māori wards and constituencies was supported by the Labour, Alliance, and Green parties, it was opposed by the conservative National Party, the populist New Zealand First Party, and the libertarian ACT Party. (While he supported the 2002 amendment to the Local Electoral Act, the Green Party co-leader, Rod Donald, though not his Party, had opposed the Bay of Plenty legislation due to its compulsory nature and preferring Single Transferable Votes.)

In 2006, the National Party MP for Bay of Plenty, Tony Ryall (who had been Minister of Local Government for six months in 1998–1999), moved a private member's bill seeking the repeal of both pieces of Māori ward legislation, arguing that, since the opt-in provisions in the Local Electoral Act 2001 had not been used in four years, the wards were "unused... antiquated... not necessary [and] divisive." The motion failed.

Initial expansion and resistance
In 2010, Māori Party MP Te Ururoa Flavell sought a law change to make it compulsory for all councils to have Māori seats. At that time, Bay of Plenty Regional Council was still the only local authority to have Māori representation. Flavell's proposal failed, but not before it was declared to be inconsistent with the New Zealand Bill of Rights Act 1990 due to using a different Māori representation formula that the Attorney-General Chris Finlayson stated would "lead to disparity in representation between Māori wards... and general wards." The difference was that the formula used the number of people of Māori descent rather than the number of people on the Māori electoral roll.

In October 2011, the Waikato Regional Council voted 14–2 to establish two Māori seats in preparation for the 2013 local body elections. A poll was not demanded and the constituencies were established. In late October 2017, the Waikato Regional Council voted by a margin of 7–3 to retain both Maori constituencies Nga Hau e Wha and Nga Tai ki Uta.

In 2014, the Mayor of New Plymouth Andrew Judd proposed introducing a Māori ward in the New Plymouth District Council. The council resolved to do so, but was defeated in a 2015 referendum by a margin of 83% to 17%. The backlash Judd experienced was an influence on his decision not to run for a second term during the 2016 local body elections. In April 2016, Flavell, now a Māori Party co-leader, presented a petition to the New Zealand Parliament on behalf of Judd that advocated (as Flavell had done previously) the establishment of mandatory Māori wards on every district council in New Zealand. In June 2017, a private members' bill in the name of Marama Davidson sought to remove the poll provision, but was defeated during its first reading.

A poll on establishing Māori wards at Wairoa District Council was held alongside that council's October 2016 triennial election and was successful; elections for three Māori seats at that council were held in October 2019. Following this result, five territorial authorities (Palmerston North City Council, Kaikōura District Council, Whakatāne District Council, Manawatu District Council, and Western Bay of Plenty District Council) approved, in separate decisions over late 2017, to introduce Māori wards for the 2019 local elections.

In response, the lobby group Hobson's Pledge (fronted by former National Party and ACT New Zealand leader Don Brash) organised several petitions calling for local referendums on the matter of introducing Māori wards and constituencies, taking advantage of the poll provision. These polls were granted and held in early 2018. Each poll failed; Māori wards were rejected by voters in Palmerston North (68.8%), Western Bay of Plenty (78.2%), Whakatāne (56.4%), Manawatu (77%), and Kaikōura (55%) on 19 May 2018. The average voter turnout in those polls was about 40%.

The rejection of Māori wards was welcomed by Brash and conservative broadcaster Mike Hosking. By contrast, the referendum results were met with dismay by Whakatāne Mayor Tony Bonne and several Māori leaders including Labour MPs Willie Jackson and Tāmati Coffey, former Māori Party co-leader Te Ururoa Flavell, Bay of Plenty resident and activist Toni Boynton, and left-wing advocacy group ActionStation national director Laura O'Connell Rapira. In response, ActionStation organised a petition calling on the Minister of Local Government, Nanaia Mahuta, to change the law so that establishing a Māori ward uses the same process as establishing a general ward (general wards are not subject to the poll provision, but have a different appeals process through the Local Government Commission).

The Labour Party has supported changes to the laws regarding Māori wards and constituencies; two bills were introduced by backbench Labour MP Rino Tirikatene in 2019 (the first a local bill seeking permanent representation for Ngāi Tahu on the Canterbury Regional Council; the second a member's bill to ensure that the repeal of legislation establishing Māori seats in Parliament must be subject to a 75% supermajority of Parliament), but both failed.

Seven territorial authorities have determined to establish Māori wards ahead of the 2022 New Zealand local elections (Whangarei District Council, Kaipara District Council, Northland Regional Council, Tauranga City Council, Ruapehu District Council, New Plymouth District Council, and South Taranaki District Council). While polls for some of those districts have been signalled, Mahuta has stated that removing the poll provision is "on her list" for the Sixth Labour Government's second term.

Legislative entrenchment
On 1 February 2021, Minister of Local Government Mahuta announced that the Government would establish a new law upholding local council decisions to establish Māori wards. This new law would also abolish an existing law allowing local referendums to veto decisions by councils to establish Māori wards. This law would come into effect before the scheduled 2022 local body elections. On 25 February, Mahuta's Local Electoral (Māori Wards and Māori Constituencies) Amendment Act 2021, which eliminates mechanisms for holding referendums on the establishment of Māori wards and constituencies on local bodies, passed its third reading in Parliament with the support of the Labour, Green and Māori parties. The bill was unsuccessfully opposed by the National and ACT parties, with the former mounting a twelve-hour filibuster challenging all of the Bill's ten clauses.

Hawkes' Bay Regional Council
In late October 2021, the Hawke's Bay Regional Council voted to establish two new Māori constituencies called "Māui ki te Raki" and "Māui ki te Tonga."

Rotorua Lakes Council
In mid November 2021, the Rotorua Lakes Council voted to establish a new Māori ward seat. The Māori partnership organisation Te Tatau o Te Arawa expressed disappointment with the Council's decision, claiming that it did not provide Māori with adequate representation. While Rotorua District councillors had preferred a governing arrangement consisting of three Māori ward seats, three general seats, and four at-large seats, that model was not lawful under the Local Electoral Act 2001.

In April 2022, Labour Member of Parliament Tāmati Coffey introduced the Rotorua District Council (Representation Arrangements) Bill that would seek an exemption from the Local Electoral Act's requirements preventing the Council's preferred 3-3-4 governing arrangement. Coffey's Rotorua electoral bill passed its first reading on 6 April 2022 and was referred to the Māori Affairs Committee. The Labour, Green and Māori parties (77 votes) supported the bill while the National and ACT parties opposed the bill. Following complaints about the short two-weeks timeframe for submission, the bill's submission period was extended until 4 May 2022.

In late April 2022, the Attorney General David Parker released a report expressing concern that the proposed Rotorua electoral bill breached the New Zealand Bill of Rights Act 1990 since it discriminated against general roll voters by allocating more seats to Māori ward voters. Rotorua's general roll had 55,600 voters while its Māori roll had 21,700 voters. In response, Māori Development Minister Willie Jackson and Deputy Prime Minister Grant Robertson stated that they would not support the bill in its current form. The National Party's justice spokesperson Paul Goldsmith claimed that the bill breached the principle of "equal suffrage" by giving Maori electoral roll votes 2.5 times the value of general roll votes. Māori Party co-leader Rawiri Waititi defended Coffey's Rotorua Bill, claiming that it gave equal representation to Māori. On 28 April 2022, Coffey and the Rotorua Lakes Council agreed to "pause" the bill's select committee process in order to address the legal issues raised by the Attorney General.

Canterbury Regional Council
In early December 2021, Rino Tirikatene's Canterbury Regional Council (Ngāi Tahu Representation) Bill passed its first reading in the New Zealand Parliament by a margin of 77 to 43 votes. While the Labour, Green and Māori parties supported the legislation, it was opposed by the opposition National and ACT parties. The bill proposes adding two seats for Māori tribal Ngāi Tahu representatives to the Canterbury Regional Council (Environment Canterbury), boosting the body's membership to 16 members. The proposed legislation was supported by Environment Canterbury and the Ngāi Tahu sub-groups Papatipu Rūnanga and Te Rūnanga o Ngāi Tahu.

By 9 February, the Māori Affairs Select Committee had received almost 1,700 submissions regarding the proposed bill. Federated Farmers' South Canterbury chairman Greg Anderson stated that the Ngāi Tahu representatives should be elected either by the tribe or the general Canterbury population.

On 3 July, the Ngāi Tahu Representation Bill passed its third and final reading. The bill's passage was welcomed by the Labour Party and Ngāi Tahu representatives including Tipene O'Regan as a means of ensuring Māori representation at the local government level and upholding the partnership aspects of the Treaty of Waitangi. The opposition National Party vowed to repeal the bill on the grounds that it did not uphold electoral equality for all New Zealanders and did not provide electoral accountability.

Councils with Māori wards or constituencies 
At the 2022 local elections, six of the eleven regional councils (54.5%) have Māori constituencies and 29 of the 67 territorial authorities (43.3%) have Māori wards.

Regional councils 

 Northland Regional Council
 Waikato Regional Council
 Bay of Plenty Regional Council
 Hawke's Bay Regional Council
 Taranaki Regional Council
 Horizons Regional Council

Territorial authorities 

 Far North District Council
 Whangarei District Council
 Kaipara District Council
 Waikato District Council
 Matamata-Piako District Council
 Hamilton City Council
 Waipā District Council
 Ōtorohanga District Council
 Taupō District Council
 Tauranga City Council
 Rotorua Lakes Council
 Whakatāne District Council
 Gisborne District Council
 Wairoa District Council
 Hastings District Council
 New Plymouth District Council
 Stratford District Council
 South Taranaki District Council
 Ruapehu District Council
 Rangitīkei District Council
 Manawatū District Council
 Palmerston North City Council
 Tararua District Council
 Horowhenua District Council
 Porirua City Council
 Wellington City Council
 Masterton District Council
 Nelson City Council
 Marlborough District Council

Notes and references

Local government in New Zealand
Māori politics
Politics of New Zealand